Bruce Beekley (born Bruce Edward Beekley) is a former linebacker in the National Football League. Beekley was drafted in the tenth round of the 1979 NFL Draft by the Atlanta Falcons. He would play the following season with the Green Bay Packers.

References

Green Bay Packers players
American football linebackers
Oregon Ducks football players
1956 births
Living people
Players of American football from Cincinnati